Uchenna Uzo (born December 27, 1992) is a Nigerian footballer who currently plays for USL League One club Chattanooga Red Wolves SC as a defender. His brother is fellow footballer Tobenna Uzo.

Career

College and amateur
Uzo played three years of college soccer at Coastal Carolina University between 2012 and 2014. He had attended Houston Baptist University in 2011, but didn't compete athletically.

While at college, Uzo played with K-W United in the Premier Development League during their 2013 season.

Professional
Uzo signed with United Soccer League side Arizona United in March 2016.

Uzo joined USL League One side Chattanooga Red Wolves SC in January 2020.

References

1992 births
Living people
Association football defenders
Coastal Carolina Chanticleers men's soccer players
Expatriate soccer players in Canada
Expatriate soccer players in the United States
K-W United FC players
Nigerian expatriate footballers
Nigerian footballers
Phoenix Rising FC players
Pittsburgh Riverhounds SC players
Chattanooga Red Wolves SC players
Soccer players from Houston
USL League Two players
USL Championship players
Houston Christian University alumni
USL League One players